is a passenger railway station located in the city of Ebina, Kanagawa Prefecture, Japan, operated by the East Japan Railway Company (JR East).

Lines

Station layout
The station consists of a single side platform with a small station building. The station is unattended.

History
Kadosawabashi Station was opened on July 1, 1931, as a rail siding on the Sagami Railway. On June 1, 1944, the Sagami Railway was nationalized and merged with the Japan National Railways; on the same day, the Kadoawabashi was elevated to the status of a full station. The station has been unmanned since 1962, with tickets sold at nearby shops. On April 1, 1987, with the dissolution and privatization of the Japan National Railways, the station came under the operation of JR East. Automated turnstiles using the Suica IC card system came into operation from November 2001.

Passenger statistics
In fiscal 2014, the station was used by an average of 1,862 passengers daily (boarding passengers only).

Surrounding area
 Ebina City Arima Library
 Fujifilm Business Innovation Ebina Office
 Nissin Industry
Kanagawa West Post Office
Kadosawabashi Elementary School

See also
List of railway stations in Japan

References
Yoshikawa, Fumio. Tokaido-sen 130-nen no ayumi. Grand-Prix Publishing (2002) .

External links

 JR East station information 

Railway stations in Japan opened in 1944
Railway stations in Kanagawa Prefecture
Sagami Line
Ebina, Kanagawa